Kadhim Aboud  (1 July 1948 – 12 July 2018) was an Iraqi football midfielder who played for Iraq between 1969 and 1970.

On 11 July 2018, Aboud died at the age of 70.

References

External links
https://twitter.com/hassaninmubarak

1948 births
2018 deaths
Iraqi footballers
Iraq international footballers
Association football midfielders